Michael Chadwick may refer to:
 Michael Chadwick (cricketer),English cricketer
 Michael Chadwick (swimmer), American swimmer
 Michael Chadwick (Hollyoaks)